Mount Vernon is a magisterial district in the southeastern sector of Fairfax County, Virginia which encompasses the area along the Potomac River, Mount Vernon, Fort Belvoir, and Gunston Hall. It includes the CDPs of Belle Haven, New Alexandria, Huntington, Groveton, Hybla Valley, Fort Hunt, Mount Vernon, Fort Belvoir, Mason Neck, Lorton, and Newington, Virginia. The office of the district is on 2511 Parkers Lane, Alexandria, VA 22306; Annual Town Meetings are held at Mount Vernon High School's "Little Theatre".  the population was 127,637. Dan Storck is the current supervisor.

Demographics

Mount Vernon District has a total population of 126,963 with 47,004 households. The median market value of single-family detached homes in Mount Vernon is $627,341. The median market value for all housing units in Mount Vernon is $518,056.

Geography

The district is characterized by rolling hills, forests, streams, lakes, and is located along the Potomac River.

History

Mount Vernon District is built on former plantation land, primarily the plantation of Mount Vernon belonging to George Washington. George Mason's Gunston Hall Plantation, Woodlawn Plantation, and Hollin Hall Plantation are also located in Mount Vernon.

References

Geography of Fairfax County, Virginia